The Butler-Perozzi Fountain is a fountain in Ashland, Oregon, United States. The fountain was displayed at the Panama–Pacific International Exposition (1915), then purchased and gifted to the City of Ashland by Gwin S. Butler and Domingo Perozzi.

References

External links
 
 Butler-Perozzi Fountain – Ashland, OR at Waymarking
 Ashland Parks Foundation Raises Nearly $16,000 for Butler-Perozzi Fountain Repairs, City of Ashland

Fountains in Oregon
Outdoor sculptures in Ashland, Oregon
Panama–Pacific International Exposition